Francisco Abreu (born 30 August 1943) is a Spanish professional golfer.

Being a former wrestler from Tenerife, Spain, Abreu turned professional in 1968 and played on the European Tour from its first official season in 1972 until 1980. He was known as along hitter and won the 1973 German Open, at Golf Club Hubbelrath, close to Düsseldorf, Germany, and the 1976 Madrid Open at Real Club de la Puerta de Hierro, Madrid, Spain. At his second win, he was  9 strokes ahead of fellow country man Antonio Garrido on second place. His best Order of Merit finish of ninth came in 1977. From 1994 to 1999 he played on the European Seniors Tour. He did not win at that tour, but had some success on the senior level by winning the 1999 Spanish Seniors Professional Closed Championship and twice finish second in that tournament.

Professional wins (4)

European Tour wins (2)

Other wins (1)
1973 Spanish Professional Closed Championship

Other senior wins (1)
1999 Spanish Seniors Professional Closed Championship

Results in major championships

Note: Abreu only played in the Open Championship.

CUT = missed the half-way cut (3rd round cut in 1971 Open Championship)
"T" = tied

Team appearances
Sotogrande Match/Hennessy Cognac Cup (representing the Continent of Europe): 1974, 1978, 1980
Double Diamond International (representing Continental Europe): 1976, 1977

References

External links

Spanish male golfers
European Tour golfers
European Senior Tour golfers
People from Tenerife
Sportspeople from the Province of Santa Cruz de Tenerife
1943 births
Living people
20th-century Spanish people
21st-century Spanish people